Victoria Awards may refer to:

Victoria Award, a Swedish sporting award, formerly known as the Victoria Scholarship
Russian National Music Award, also known as the Victoria Award
Music Victoria Awards, an award for achievements in the regional music scene of Victoria, Australia